Pavel Hořava (born 22 September 1956) is a Czech politician and Secretary General of the KDU-ČSL since 2010. He is member of the party since Velvet Revolution in 1989.

References

Living people
1956 births
KDU-ČSL politicians
Politicians from Brno